"Mama Can't Buy You Love" is a hit single for English musician Elton John from the EP The Thom Bell Sessions. The song was written by LeRoy Bell and Casey James (of Bell and James fame). Bowing at number 69 on the Hot 100 on 9 June 1979, the track became John's first US top ten hit in almost three years when it peaked at number 9 on 25 August 1979.  "Mama Can't Buy You Love" also spent one week at number 1 on the Adult Contemporary chart. In the US, it was certified gold on 17 August 1979 by the RIAA.

The chord structure of the opening instrumental of "Mama Can't Buy You Love" bears a strong resemblance to the chord structure of the opening instrumental of Ronnie Dyson's "One Man Band (Plays All Alone)". According to the Hot 100, Thom Bell produced both records. The Spinners provided the background vocals on the track.

Reception
Record World said that John's "vocals are a perfect mate for Bell's sparkling lyrics, production & keyboards."

Chart performance

Weekly charts

Year-end charts

Certifications

See also
List of number-one adult contemporary singles of 1979 (U.S.)

References

Songs about mothers
Elton John songs
1979 singles
Songs written by LeRoy Bell
MCA Records singles